Artur Bäumle (4 September 1906 – 6 January 1943) was a German athlete. He competed in the men's long jump at the 1936 Summer Olympics. He was killed in action during World War II.

References

1906 births
1943 deaths
Athletes (track and field) at the 1936 Summer Olympics
German male long jumpers
Olympic athletes of Germany
Place of birth missing
German military personnel killed in World War II